Sigma is a small community near Sandbridge in the independent city of Virginia Beach, Virginia, United States. Sigma lies just south of Lago Mar on Ashville Bridge Creek along Sandbridge Road at its intersection with New Bridge Road.

The Back Bay National Wildlife Refuge has its administrative building on Sandbridge Road, and there is a large native garden of American Lotus across the street on a tributary of the Currituck Sound.  Tabernacle United Methodist Church and Margie and Ray's Crabhouse are landmarks in the Sigma area.

Like much of the Southeastern United States, the Sigma area of Virginia Beach has a subtropical climate, characterized by short, relatively mild winters and long, hot and humid summers. Daytime high temperatures in July average around 90 °F (32 °C) and in January, daytime temperatures average around 52 °F (11 °C).

Gallery

References

Communities in Virginia Beach, Virginia